Daresbury Laboratory is a scientific research laboratory based at Sci-Tech Daresbury campus near Daresbury in Halton, Cheshire, England. The laboratory began operations in 1962 and was officially opened on 16 June 1967 as the Daresbury Nuclear Physics Laboratory by the then Prime Minister of United Kingdom, Harold Wilson. It was the second national laboratory established by the British National Institute for Research in Nuclear Science, following the Rutherford High Energy Laboratory (now Rutherford Appleton Laboratory). It is operated by the Science and Technology Facilities Council, part of UK Research and Innovation. As of 2018, it employs around 300 staff, with Paul Vernon appointed as director in November 2020, taking over from Professor Susan Smith who had been director from 2012.

Description

Daresbury Laboratory carries out research in fields such as accelerator science, bio-medicine, physics, chemistry, materials, engineering and computational science. Its facilities are used by scientists and engineers, from both the university research community and industrial research base. The laboratory is based at Sci-Tech Daresbury.

Facilities and research

 Accelerator science, including the Cockcroft Institute which houses scientists from STFC, University of Manchester, University of Liverpool, University of Lancaster, and University of Strathclyde. Accelerator science facilities include:
 VELA, an electron compact linear accelerator, based around an RF photocathode gun.
 CLARA, an electron linear accelerator to be used for research in free-electron lasers.
 SuperSTEM, a national research facility for advanced electron microscopy. The facility belongs to EPSRC.
 The Hartree Centre, a high performance computing, data analytics and AI research facility.
 Scientific computing
 Nuclear physics
 Detector systems
 Engineering Technology Centre 
 Public engagement
 The University of Liverpool Virtual Engineering Centre

Retired facilities

NINA
ALICE, an electron accelerator previously known as ERLP (Energy Recovery Linac Prototype).
 EMMA, a linear non-scaling FFAG accelerator.
 HPCx, a supercomputer (replaced by the UK national supercomputing service, HECToR, based in Edinburgh).
 Synchrotron Radiation Source

Awards

In 2009 the laboratory was awarded the title of the "Most Outstanding Science Park" at the UK Science Parks Association.

See also

 Alec Merrison Daresbury Laboratory's first director
 Cockcroft Institute International centre for accelerator science and technology at Sci-Tech Daresbury
 Van de Graaff generator The former Nuclear Structure Facility at Daresbury was based on a Van de Graaff accelerator
 Arthur Dooley The Laboratory has a piece 'Splitting of the Atom', unveiled in 1971, constructed from magnetic steel and two 37 inch pole tips taken from the cyclotron.

References

External links

 Daresbury Laboratory at Sci-Tech Daresbury
 The Science and Technology Facilities Council
 Synchrotron Radiation Source
 Accelerator Science and Technology Centre
 4GLS - the proposed Fourth Generation Light Source

Laboratories in the United Kingdom
Organizations established in 1962
Research institutes in Cheshire
Physics laboratories
Science and Technology Facilities Council
Synchrotron radiation facilities
1962 establishments in the United Kingdom